Romário Leiria de Moura or simply Romário (born 28 June 1992 in Porto Alegre) is a Brazilian footballer who plays as a defender for Veranópolis.

Honours
Internacional
Campeonato Gaúcho: 2012, 2013

International

Brazil U20
2011 South American Youth Championship
FIFA U-20 World Cup (1): 2011

References

External links

1992 births
Living people
Brazilian footballers
Brazilian expatriate footballers
Brazil youth international footballers
Brazil under-20 international footballers
Footballers at the 2011 Pan American Games
Campeonato Brasileiro Série A players
Primeira Liga players
Sport Club Internacional players
Clube Náutico Capibaribe players
Paysandu Sport Club players
C.S. Marítimo players
Sport Club São Paulo players
Boa Esporte Clube players
Clube Atlético Metropolitano players
Afturelding men's football players
Veranópolis Esporte Clube Recreativo e Cultural players
Brazilian expatriate sportspeople in Portugal
Brazilian expatriate sportspeople in Iceland
Expatriate footballers in Portugal
Expatriate footballers in Iceland
Association football defenders
Pan American Games competitors for Brazil
Footballers from Porto Alegre